Lawrence Ko (born 28 April 1977) is a Taiwanese actor.

Ko made his film debut when he was four years old. He has had roles in the Edward Yang films A Brighter Summer Day (1991), Mahjong (1996) and  Yi Yi (2000), as well as the film Lust, Caution by Ang Lee. In 2011, he starred in the biopic  Jump Ashin! (2011). He also appeared in the films Will You Still Love Me Tomorrow? (2013), To My Dear Granny (2013) and Murmur of the Hearts (2015).

Personal life
He is the son of director and actor .

Filmography

Film

Television series

Music video

Awards and nominations

References

External links
 
 
 

1977 births
Living people
Male actors from Taipei
20th-century Taiwanese male actors
21st-century Taiwanese male actors
Taiwanese male film actors
Taiwanese male television actors
Taipei National University of the Arts alumni
Best Supporting Actor Asian Film Award winners